Voice over Asynchronous Transfer Mode (VoATM) is a data protocol used to transport packetized voice signals over an Asynchronous Transfer Mode (ATM) network.  In ATM, the voice traffic is encapsulated using AAL1/AAL2 ATM packets. VoATM over DSL is a similar service, which is used to carry packetized voice signals over a DSL connection.

Protocols
 ATM Adaptation Layer 1 (AAL1)
 ATM Adaptation Layer 2 (AAL2)

Deployment
VoATM is a multi-service, high speed, scalable technology but rarely found because of its expensive services.

Prioritization
Prioritization is implemented through QoS parameters.

Fragmentation
Fragmentation is built into ATM with its small, fixed-sized, 53-byte cells.

Variable delay
Dynamic Bandwidth Circuit Emulation Service (DBCES) does not send a constant bit stream of cells but transmit only at an active voice call, reducing delays and variations.

Echo cancellation
VoATM transports data, voice, and video at very high speed. The same method for echo cancellation is employed.

See also
Professional wide band audio over ATM. Audio Engineering Society AES47

References

Broadband
Videotelephony
Audio network protocols